Etchegoyen is a surname. Notable people with the surname include:

 Alain Etchegoyen (1951–2007), French philosopher and novelist
 Anne Etchegoyen (born 1980), Basque French singer and songwriter
 Horacio Etchegoyen (1919–2016), Argentine psychoanalyst
 Matias Etchegoyen (born 1995), Argentine footballer